Aghbolagh-e Sofla (also Romanized as Āghbolāgh-e Soflá; also known as Āqbolāgh-e Soflá) is a village in Quri Chay-ye Gharbi Rural District, Saraju District, Maragheh County, East Azerbaijan Province, Iran. At the 2006 census, its population was 139, in 28 families.

References 

Towns and villages in Maragheh County